Nanfang Building is a historic high-rise building in Guangzhou, China. At the time of its completion in 1922, it was the tallest building in the country. Since then, it has served as offices, department stores, electronics markets, and hotels.

See also
 Aiqun Hotel
 List of tallest buildings in Guangzhou

References

Buildings and structures completed in 1922
1922 establishments in China
Buildings and structures in Guangzhou